Zah is a surname and a masculine given name. Notable people with the name are as follows:

Surname
Felician Záh (died 1330), Hungarian nobleman and soldier
Peterson Zah (1937–2023), American politician

Given name
Zah Rahan Krangar (born 1985), Liberian professional footballer 

Masculine given names